Produced By Skip Drinkwater
Co-Produced By Alphonse Mouzon

The Man Incognito is the fourth album by American jazz drummer Alphonse Mouzon recorded in 1975 and released on the Blue Note label.

Reception
The AllMusic review by Robert Taylor awarded the album 2 stars stating "Most of the arrangements here are repetitive and were obviously meant to be used as dance music. Fusion fans are encouraged to steer clear of this one, as it amounts to nothing more than a '70s disco session -- and a boring one at that".

Track listing
All compositions by Alphonse Mouzon
 "Take Your Troubles Away" - 5:03  
 "Snake Walk" - 3:49  
 "Before You Leave" - 4:26  
 "Just Like The Sun" - 6:30  
 "You Are My Dream" - 3:30  
 "New York City" - 4:06  
 "Without A Reason" - 4:09  
 "Mouzon Moves On" - 3:41  
 "Behind Your Mind" - 4:06 
Recorded at Sound Labs in Los Angeles, California on December 2, 1975

Personnel
Alphonse Mouzon  - drums, percussion, vocals, synthesizer
Gary Grant - trumpet
George Bohanon - trombone
Ray Pizzi - tenor saxophone, alto saxophone
Tom Scott - tenor saxophone, baritone saxophone, Lyricon
David Benoit - piano, electric piano
Dave Grusin - piano, electric piano, clavinet
Dawilli Gonga, Ian Underwood - synthesizer
David T. Walker - guitar (track 6)
Lee Ritenour - guitar, electric guitar
Tim DeHuff - electric guitar
Charles Meeks - electric bass
Emil Richards - cymbals, percussion
Victor Feldman - conga, bongo, percussion
Marty McCall, Jackie Ward, Caroline Willis - vocals

References

Blue Note Records albums
Alphonse Mouzon albums
1976 albums